The Özal family is a political family in Turkey, the most prominent member being Turgut Özal, the 8th President (1989–1993) and Prime Minister of Turkey (1983–1989). The family has been active in Turkish politics since the 1970s. Özal was a popular political figure in Turkey and founded the Motherland Party in 1983, which won the general elections of the same year. After his death in 1993, his son Ahmet Özal succeeded him as the de facto patriarch of the family.

Mehmet Sıddık Özal (1900–1953) and Hafize (1906–1988):
Turgut Özal (1927–1993) and Semra Yeğinmen (born 1934):
Zeynep Özal (born 1955), businesswoman
 Yağız Ekren
 Uğur Ekren
Ahmet Özal (born 1955), politician and businessman
 Merve Özal
 Turgut Özal
Efe Özal (born 1968), businessman
 Kaan Turgut Özal
 Semra Naz Özal
 Serra Özal
 Korkut Özal (1929–2014), politician
F. Zehra Özal
Murat Mehmet Özal (1955–2013), businessman
H. Ayşegül Özal
M. Ali Özal
A. Bahaddin Özal
 Yusuf Bozkurt Özal (1940–2001), politician
İbrahim Reyhan Özal (born 1965 in London), politician
 Ceyda Özal
 İrem Özal
 Kerim Özal
 Meryem Özal
 Enes Özal
Elif Özal Danışman (born 1968 in Ankara)
 Ömer Kaan Danışman (born 1991, in Brussels) 
 Ilayda Nur Danışman (born 1996, in Brussels) 
 Emir Can Danışman (born 1999, in Ankara)
Yasemin Özal Fırat (born 1971 in Ankara) 
 Lara Fırat (born 2002, in Ankara)
 Lina Fırat (born 2003, in Ankara)

Politics 

Turgut Özal's son, Ahmet, remained in parliament until 2002. His younger brother Efe stayed out of politics and is a businessman. Efe's son, Kaan Turgut Özal, who was born the day after his grandfather Turgut's burial in 1993 and was named after him, briefly said in an interview that he was interested in politics and wanted to follow in his grandfather's footsteps.

References

See also
 Özal University
 ODAŞ Group

 
Turkish families
Ozal
Ozal